St. Peter's Lutheran Church is a historic church at 701 North Orleans in Dell Rapids, South Dakota. It was added to the National Register in 2002.

St. Peter's congregation was first organized in 1887. The Romanesque Revival style church was built in 1902. The church was constructed of Sioux Quartzite, quarried locally. It was designed and constructed by the Paulson Brothers of Dell Rapids. In the year of 1918 the congregations of Stordahl and St. Peter's Lutheran Churches were combined.  It was at this point that the name of the congregation changed to the Lutheran Church in Dell Rapids.

References

External links
Lutheran Church in Dell Rapids website

Lutheran churches in South Dakota
Churches on the National Register of Historic Places in South Dakota
Romanesque Revival church buildings in South Dakota
Churches completed in 1902
Churches in Minnehaha County, South Dakota
National Register of Historic Places in Minnehaha County, South Dakota
Religious organizations established in 1887